"Your Time Has Come" is a song by the American hard rock band Audioslave. It was released in May 2005 as the second single from their second album Out of Exile.

Track listing
 "Your Time Has Come" – 4:15

Song meaning
The song was inspired by the 1980s song "People Who Died," by The Jim Carroll Band, an emotional salute to the casualties of New York drug culture written by poet and singer Jim Carroll, who also wrote the autobiographical The Basketball Diaries. As Chris Cornell explained: "It's a bunch of references to people that I knew that ... were younger than me who've been dead for years and years, up to a couple of years ago."it is also about people who killed themselves before their time has come."

The lyrics also make a reference to the Vietnam Veterans Memorial. ("...I've seen fifty-thousand names all engraved on a stone..."). As Cornell has put it: "And then just kind of that juxtaposition of, even though it seems a lot for one person, a young healthy person, to have lost all these friends through various means of stupidity and other things, then making reference to the Vietnam War Memorial and the sheer numbers of dead. And remembering that and pointing out that each one of them has a family, each one of them has friends that are sitting around thinking about the same stuff that I did. But the numbers are astounding and, in a sense, kind of criminal. And that's what the song's about."

Music video
The music video for the song consists of powerful scenes from their free live show in Cuba, which was the first time a rock band from the U.S. played in Cuba. It was held in May 2005, and also a DVD came out about this concert. Besides the concert footage moments from the life of Audioslave can be seen in the video (the band on the road, giving interviews, etc.).

Charts

Peak positions

References

External links

Audioslave songs
2005 singles
Song recordings produced by Rick Rubin
Song recordings produced by Chris Cornell
Songs written by Chris Cornell
Songs written by Brad Wilk
Songs written by Tom Morello
Songs written by Tim Commerford
2005 songs